The men's 5000 metres event was part of the track and field athletics programme at the 1928 Summer Olympics. The competition was held on Tuesday, July 31, 1928, and on Friday, August 3, 1928. Thirty-eight long-distance runners from 19 nations competed.

Records
These were the standing world and Olympic records (in minutes) prior to the 1928 Summer Olympics.

Results

Semifinals

All semifinals were held on Tuesday, July 31, 1928, and started at 5:10 p.m.

The best four finishers of every heat qualified for the final.

Semifinal 1

Semifinal 2

Semifinal 3

Final
The final was held on Friday, August 3, 1928, and started at 2:30 p.m.

The same three runners finished on the podium as four years earlier in the 5000 metre event at the 1924 Games. But this time Ritola won the gold medal and Nurmi silver, Wide won the bronze medal again.

References

External links
 Official Olympic Report
 

5000 metres
5000 metres at the Olympics
Men's events at the 1928 Summer Olympics